Heathcote Road is a major arterial road in the south of Sydney, New South Wales, Australia. It runs from Newbridge Road in Liverpool to the Princes Highway in Heathcote.

History
Heathcote Road was constructed during World War II as a military defence route and a way to bypass the old Illawarra Road which used the ridge lines and a causeway crossing of the Woronora River between Menai and Engadine. Construction began in 1940 and was completed in 1943.

Geography
Heathcote Road plays a major role in the servicing of traffic travelling between the Illawarra and Western Sydney and also provides access to the Holsworthy Barracks. 

Other major adjoining roads are the M5 Motorway in Liverpool and the New Illawarra Road at Lucas Heights.

Vegetation
As its name suggests, the road is generally surrounded by heath, but more often dry eucalyptus woodlands and shrublands with some mallee vegetation.

Incidents
The road has a history of accidents, due to its narrow nature, the number of blind corners and the steep gradients.

See also

References

Streets in Sydney
Heathcote, New South Wales